Games People Play is the third studio album by Pink Cream 69. It was the final album with Andi Deris on vocals.

Track listing

Personnel
Andi Deris – vocals
Alfred Koffler – guitar
Dennis Ward – bass guitar
Kosta Zafiriou – drums

Production
Mixing – Dirk Steffens and Gerhard Wolfle
Engineer – Dirk Steffens and Birger Holm

Artwork
The artwork by W. A. Motzek is based on the painting Etude de 35 têtes d'expression by French artist Louis-Leopold Boilly.

References

External links
Heavy Harmonies page

1993 albums
Pink Cream 69 albums
Epic Records albums
Albums produced by Dirk Steffens